Aeromachus stigmata, the veined scrub hopper, is a skipper, a type of butterfly in the family Hesperiidae. The species was first described by Frederic Moore in 1878.

Subspecies
There are three subspecies of Aeromachus stigmata:

 Aeromachus stigmata stigmata (Moore, 1878) – Himalayan veined scrub hopper
 Aeromachus stigmata obsoleta (Moore, 1878) – Patkai veined scrub hopper
 Aeromachus stigmata shanda

Description

The species was described by Edward Yerbury Watson in his 1891 Hesperiidae Indica as:

Distribution and habitat
Aeromachus stigmata stigmata is distributed from Murree in Pakistan to Arunachal Pradesh; the north sest Himalayas, Sikkim and Bhutan. A. s. obsoletus is distributed in north-eastern India, south-eastern Bangladesh, and northern Myanmar. A. s. shanda is found in Myanmar from the northern Shan States to Kayin State.

They are predominantly found from the foothills to 1700 meter open forest regions. Their flight period is from April to October. In India, May is the best time to spot them. They fly close to the ground and are sometimes spotted basking on the shrubs or grass.

References

stigmata
Butterflies described in 1878
Taxa named by Frederic Moore
Butterflies of Asia